"I Love My Dog" is a song written by Cat Stevens, and was his first single (b/w "Portobello Road"), appearing the following year on his debut album Matthew and Son. Stevens later acknowledged that he had essentially written the lyrics to the music of American jazz multi-instrumentalist Yusef Lateef's "The Plum Blossom", from his 1961 Eastern Sounds. Stevens indicated that he "told Yusef Lateef about it, gave him a big cheque, and in fact, started paying him royalties." The song is now released with credits that include Yusef Lateef.

The B-side, "Portobello Road", is about the famous street of the same name and market in London, England. The song lyric was written by American Kim Fowley, and Stevens was asked to collaborate by composing music for it. It was later covered by Stevens' first guitarist, Alun Davies, after signing with Island Records in 1970. Davies' version appeared on his first solo album, Daydo, in 1974.

"I Love My Dog" peaked at No. 28 in the UK Singles Chart in November 1966, spending seven weeks on that chart.

The song has also been covered by Carolyn Hester, Theo Bikel, Linda Tillery and Mike Batt.

Personnel
Cat Stevens - vocals, guitar
Alan Tew - orchestral arrangements

References

External links
 I Love My Dog at songfacts.com

1966 songs
1966 debut singles
Cat Stevens songs
Deram Records singles
Song recordings produced by Mike Hurst (producer)
Songs about dogs
Songs written by Cat Stevens